Church-State Council against Bogomilism was convened around 1176 by the Grand Župan Stefan Nemanja in the old Peter's Church in Ras, Grand Principality of Serbia. At the council, Bogomilism was condemned as a heresy whose mention was forbidden, their leader was "engraved with a tongue in his throat", religious elders were burned at the stake, while many believers were punished with various corporal punishments and expelled from the country, and all their property is taken away.

References 

Bogomilism
12th century in Serbia